Jay Arlen Jones (born March 8, 1954) was an American film and television actor, born in Los Angeles, California, and active since the early 1980s. His most recognized role is that of Occam, the African-American slave enlisted as a Patriot fighter by his master, in the Revolutionary War epic The Patriot (2000). After portraying Leon in Eight Legged Freaks (2001), he participated in the short film Nines and the television film The Least Among You (2009), but has not appeared onscreen since.

Credits 1983-1989
 Tour of Duty (1 episode, 1989)
 Promised Land (1989) TV episode
 L.A. Law, Cop #1 (2 episodes, 1986–1989)
 Izzy Ackerman or Is He Not (1989) TV episode, Cop #1
 Fry Me to the Moon (1986) TV episode, Cop #2
 Twins (1988/I), Mover #1
 The Diamond Trap (1988) (TV), Cop
 You Talkin' to Me? (1987), Actor #1
 No Way Out (1987), Marine Guard #1
 Dallas (1 episode, 1987)
 War and Peace (1987) TV episode
 Knots Landing, Bank Teller (1 episode, 1987)
 A Plan of Action (1987) TV episode, Bank Teller
 Night of the Creeps (1986), Cop at police station
 Space Baby (1986) Pilot episode, Dumping Jack Trash (voice)
 Club Life (1986), Black Punk
 Trapper John, M.D., Workman #2 (1 episode, 1985)
 Billboard Barney (1985) TV episode, Workman #2
 Scarecrow and Mrs. King (1 episode, 1985)
 The Wrong Way Home (1985) TV episode
 Dynasty, Desk Clerk #1 (1 episode, 1983)
 The Threat (1983) TV episode, Desk Clerk #1

Credits 1990-1995
 Absolute Zero (1995) TV episode, inmate/Joe 'J.C.' Carter
 Sister, Sister, preacher (1 episode, 1994)
 The Pimple (1994) TV episode, preacher
 The Fresh Prince of Bel-Air, Chessler (1 episode, 1994)Who's the Boss? (1994) TV episode, Chessler
 Relentless 3 (1993) (V), Angry Man
aka Relentless III - USA (TV title)
 Extreme Justice (1993), Nash
 Reasonable Doubts, Baker (1 episode, 1992)
 The Discomfort Zone (1992) TV episode, Baker
 Beverly Hills, 90210 Bartender (1 episode, 1991)
aka Class of Beverly Hills - USA (teaser title)
 Necessity Is a Mother (1991) TV episode, Bartender
 In the Heat of the Night, Ticket Man (1 episode, 1991)
 Just a Country Boy (1991) TV episode, Ticket Man
 The Flash, Wayne Cotrell (1 episode, 1991)
 Beat the Clock (1991) TV episode, Wayne Cotrell
 Gabriel's Fire, Trusty (1 episode, 1990)
 The Neighborhood (1990) TV episode, Trusty
 Satan's Princess (1990) (as J. Arlen Jones), Black Romeo
 Vital Signs (1990), Paramedic

Credits 1996-2009
 The Least Among You (2009), Jojo
 Nines (2003), Happy
 Eight Legged Freaks (2002), Leon
aka "Arac Attack", Belgium (English title)
aka "Spider Panic!", Japan (English title)
 Carman: The Champion (2001), Johnny
 Le Secret (2000), Jerry Stanley
 The Patriot (2000), Occam
 The Big Thing (2000), James
 A Texas Funeral (1999), Otis
 Melrose Place, Detective Griffith (2 episodes, 1999)
 Asses to Ashes (1999) TV episode, Detective Griffith
 I Married a Jock Murderer (1999) TV episode, Detective Pavone
 Life (1999/I), Bagman
 Cloned (1997) (TV) (as Arlen Jones), father of newborn
 Assault on Dome 4 (1996) (TV), Goon #1
 Nowhere Man, Joe 'J.C.' Carter (2 episodes, 1995–1996)
 Calaway' (1996) TV episode .... Joe 'J.C.' Carter / Dr. Novak

Credits 2010-present

References

External links

Living people
American male film actors
American male television actors
1954 births